Pseudotetracha spenceri is a species of tiger beetle in the subfamily Cicindelinae that was described by Sloane in 1897, and is native to Australia.

References

Beetles described in 1897
Endemic fauna of Australia
Beetles of Australia